The Iglesia San Blas de Illescas is a Catholic parish church located on the center plaza of Coamo, Puerto Rico. Construction on the church began in 1661; it has since been judged "one of the most important works of religious architecture in Puerto Rico".

The church is separated from the open plaza below by a series of ceremonial steps and a delicate cast iron balustrade. The delicately curved Baroque facade reflects a major reconstruction completed in 1784. A two-level bell-gable with open arches and bells is prominently featured in the facade. The parish of San Blas of Coamo is one of the oldest on the island.

See also
List of the oldest buildings in Puerto Rico

References

Churches on the National Register of Historic Places in Puerto Rico
1661 establishments in Puerto Rico
Spanish Colonial architecture in Puerto Rico
Coamo, Puerto Rico
Roman Catholic churches completed in 1661
Roman Catholic churches in Puerto Rico
Baroque Revival architecture in the United States